Godavari District is one of the of Madras Presidency. It has a glorious past. Which once saw the glory of many zamindari estates and also huge estates like Peddapuram, Pithapuram, Kota Ramchandrapuram, Polvaram etc. each comprising 372, 128,66,128 respectively. It later got bifurcated into East and West Godavari in 1925. But before that these districts compressed few Zamindaries and their histories.

Zamindari System in Godavari District 
Godavari District was renamed. Originally it was Rajahmundry District having the capital of the same name but renamed in 1859. This Rajahmundry District was once ruled by 
Eastern Chalukyas
Kakatiyas
Reddy and Gajapathi Rulers
Vijayanagar Rulers
Nizam Rule
French( Granted in lease to Vizianagaram estate Raja)
Again under the Nawab who is the Subedar of Nizam
British.

During the British (1765-1947) reign in Godavarai District (Originally northern circars were acquired by the British in the Anglo-French wars in 1759 but again appointed the Nawab by Nizam which finally came to British hand in the year 1765) they acquired all the local poligars and in the Battle of Padmanabham they reduced the erstwhile Princely State of Vizianagaram to a Zamindari and made permanent settlement with them in 1802. From then the powers of old Zamindars were limited and acted as revenue collector between the government and ryots.

Zamindari Estates after the Permanent Settlement to 1843 
During the Permanenent settlement in 1802–03, few estates like Mogalutur and Korukonda were annexed into the government due to arrears and they were split into 26 Proprietary estates . By that time there are 15 ancient Zamindaries Like Peddapuram, Pithapuram , Polavaram, Kota Ramchandrapuram, Vegayammapeta, Velampalem, Venakayapalem, Vella, Telikacherla, Jalimudi, Panangipalli, Undeswarapuram, Mukkamala, Vilasa and Janupalli, Bantumilli. Besides these are there three other Mansabdari Estates, like Rampah, Totapalli, Jaddangi.

Zamindari Estates after 1843 
Many Zamindari estates were later annexed in the government due to the arrears and lost most of their villages. Then they divided the estates further and sold to other proprietors. The details were collected by  Henry Morris and wrote in the Book, A descriptive and historical account of the Godavery District in the presidency of Madras Page No:371-375.

The same has been mentioned in the book Standing Information regarding the Official Administration of Madras Presidency.

Zamindari Estates after 1920 
Later, these estates were further divided (impartiable estates weren't divided though). The list of it has been given in The Asylum Press Almanack And Directory Of Madras And Southern India 1924, Page No: 274–276.

References 

India history-related lists
Zamindari estates
History of Andhra Pradesh
Madras Presidency